Blanca Millán (born 18 May 1998) is a Spanish basketball player with CB Islas Canarias of the Liga Femenina de Baloncesto. While playing for the Maine Black Bears women's basketball team from 2016 to 2021, Millan became one of the most accomplished players in team and conference history. She is a two-time America East Player of the Year and America East Defensive Player of the Year (2019, 2021). She is the only woman in America East history to win AE Player of the Year and Defensive Player of the Year each twice.

On 18 April 2021, she signed a training camp contract with the Washington Mystics of the WNBA before being waived on 5 May.

References

1998 births
Living people
Maine Black Bears women's basketball players
Spanish expatriate basketball people in the United States
CB Islas Canarias players
Spanish women's basketball players
Forwards (basketball)